The Master of Architecture (M.Arch, or MArch) is a professional degree in architecture qualifying the graduate to move through the various stages of professional accreditation (internship, exams) that result in receiving a license.

Overview
The degree is earned through several possible paths of study, depending on both a particular program's construction, and the candidate's previous academic experience and degrees.  M.Arch. degrees vary in kind, so they are frequently given names such as "M.Arch. I" and "M.Arch. II" to distinguish them.  All M.Arch. degrees are professional degrees in architecture.  There are, however, other master's degrees offered by architecture schools that are not accredited in any way.

Many schools offer several possible tracks of architectural education.  Including study at the bachelor's and master's level, these tracks range up to 7.5 years in duration.

 One possible route is what is commonly referred to as the "4+2" course.  This path entails completing a four-year, accredited, pre-professional Bachelor of Arts in architecture or a Bachelor of Science in architecture. This degree is not 3-year, depending on the nature and quality of your undergraduate study performance, and the evaluation of your master's degree program school of your undergraduate study) Master of Architecture program.  This route offers several advantages: your first four years are a bit more loose, allowing the inclusion of some liberal arts study; you can attend two different institutions for your undergraduate and graduate study, which is helpful in that it allows you to have a more varied architectural education, and you can pick the best place for you to complete your thesis (because chances are, you might not pick the program that has the exact focus that you will want when it becomes time for your thesis study); and you will finish the 4+2 course of study with a master's degree that will provide you the career option of teaching architecture at the collegiate level.
 The second route to obtaining an accredited master's degree begins in graduate school, with a 3 or 3.5-year master's degree (commonly called an "M.Arch. I").  The advantage to this route is that the student can study something else he or she is interested in his/her undergraduate study (anything else).  Because students come from different undergraduate backgrounds, the breadth of knowledge and experience in the student body of an M.Arch. I program is often considered an advantage.  One possible disadvantage is that the total time in school is longer (7 or 7.5 years with an undergraduate degree).  Another disadvantage is that the student has a very short time to cover the extremely broad scope of subject areas of which architects are expected to have a working knowledge.  Nevertheless, major schools of architecture including MIT and Harvard often offer a 3.5-year program to students already with strong architectural background, fostering a competitive and productive academic environment.
 A third possible route is what schools are calling a "post-professional" master's degree. It is research-based and often a stepping-stone to a Doctor of Philosophy in Architecture. Schools include Cornell, Harvard, Princeton, MIT, and RISD.

It is worth noting that there is another route to becoming an architect: the continuous 5-year professional degree program.  In such a program, after five years of study, students are awarded with a professional degree in architecture. Depending on the school and course of study, this could be either a Bachelor of Architecture (B.Arch.) or an M.Arch.  In the U.S., it is typically a 5-year B.Arch.  Either degree qualifies those who complete it to sit for the ARE (the Architectural Registration Exam, the architecture equivalent of the bar exam), which leads to an architect's license in the U.S..  One disadvantage of the B.Arch. degree is that it is rarely considered as sufficient qualification for teaching architecture at the university/college level in the U.S. (though there are many exceptions).  Many architects who wish to teach and have only received a B.Arch. choose to pursue a 3-semester master's degree (not an M.Arch.) to obtain further academic qualification.

Graduate-level architecture programs consist of course work in design, building science, structural engineering, architectural history, theory, professional practice, and elective courses. For those without any prior knowledge of the field, coursework in calculus, physics, computers, statics and strengths of materials, architectural history, studio, and building science is usually required. Some architecture programs allow students to specialize in a specific aspect of architecture, such as architectural technologies or digital media. A thesis or final project is usually required to graduate.

Important to consider in choosing the school(s) for an architectural education is their overall "focus". Architectural schools usually, by virtue of the history of the school and the interests of the faculty, will approach the instruction of architecture from a technical, historical, or artistic bent—or a combination thereof. This is not something that will be spelled out in the school's literature, but will be more or less apparent in the lists of classes offered and the study areas of the faculty. While it may not seem important at first, in retrospect it will probably be a major factor.

An architectural thesis is the culmination of a student's research.  Submission of the thesis represents the completion of the final requirement for the degree and may be presented as graphic representations, a written work, or physical forms.  According to Architectural Research Methods by Linda N. Groat and David Wang, the scope of the research inquiry must not be too broad or too narrow.  A good topic will clearly and simply identify a body of literature to which the topical question can be referred.  Additionally, a thesis question must have significance to not only the student, but his or her peers, and to the field of architecture.

In the United States, The National Architectural Accrediting Board (NAAB) is the sole agency authorized to accredit US professional degree programs in architecture. Since most state registration boards in the United States require any applicant for licensure to have graduated from a NAAB-accredited program, obtaining such a degree is an essential aspect of preparing for the professional practice of architecture.

Again, first time students matriculating with a 5-year B.Arch. degree can also qualify for registration, without obtaining a master's degree.  Some programs offer a concurrent learning model, allowing students the opportunity to work in the profession while they are earning their degree, so that they can test for licensure immediately upon graduation.

In Canada, Master of Architecture degrees may be accredited by the Canadian Architectural Certification Board (CACB), allowing the recipient to qualify for both the ARE and the Examination for Architects in Canada (ExAC).

As of March 2006, there were eighty-four accredited Master of Architecture programs in the United States, including Puerto Rico. In Canada, there were ten accredited programs.

Master's degree programs

United States
Colleges and universities in the United States with accredited Master of Architecture degree programs are listed below.

Note:  Schools where a Bachelor of Architecture can also be earned are marked with *

Academy of Art University*, School of Architecture,  San Francisco, California
Andrews University, School of Architecture, Art & Design,  Berrien Springs, Michigan
Arizona State University School of Architecture and Landscape Architecture (SALA),  Tempe, Arizona
Ball State University*, Ball State University College of Architecture and Planning, Department of Architecture,  Muncie, Indiana
Boston Architectural College* Boston, Massachusetts
California College of the Arts*, Department of Architecture,  San Francisco, California
California State Polytechnic University, Pomona*, Department of Architecture,  Pomona, California
The Catholic University of America, School of Architecture and Planning,  Washington, D.C.
Clemson University, School of Architecture,  Clemson, South Carolina
City College of the City University of New York*, school of architecture, urban design and landscape architecture  New York, New York
Columbia University, Graduate School of Architecture Planning and Preservation (GSAPP),  New York, New York
Cooper Union*, The Irwin S. Chanin School of Architecture  New York, New York
Cornell University*, College of Architecture, Art and Planning  Ithaca, New York
Drury University, Hammons School of Architecture,  Springfield, Missouri
Florida A&M University*, School of Architecture,  Tallahassee, Florida
Florida International University*, School of Architecture* Miami, Florida
School of Architecture at Taliesin,  Scottsdale, Arizona & Spring Green, Wisconsin
Georgia Institute of Technology, College of Architecture,  Atlanta, Georgia
Hampton University*, School of Engineering - Architecture,  Hampton, Virginia
Harvard University, Graduate School of Design, Cambridge, Massachusetts
Illinois Institute of Technology*, College of Architecture, 
Iowa State University*, Department of Architecture,  Ames, Iowa
Judson University,  Elgin, Illinois
Kansas State University, Manhattan, Kansas
Kent State University*, College of Architecture & Environmental Design, Kent, Ohio
Lawrence Technological University, Southfield, Michigan
Louisiana State University*, College of Art + Design, Baton Rouge, Louisiana
Louisiana Tech University, School of Architecture,  Ruston, Louisiana
Massachusetts College of Art and Design, Architectural Design, Boston, Massachusetts
Massachusetts Institute of Technology, Department of Architecture , Cambridge, Massachusetts
Miami University, Oxford, Ohio
Montana State University, Bozeman, Montana
Morgan State University, Baltimore, Maryland
New Jersey Institute of Technology*,, Newark, New Jersey
New School of Architecture and Design, San Diego, California
North Carolina State University*, Raleigh, North Carolina
North Dakota State University*, Fargo, North Dakota
Northeastern University, School of Architecture,  Boston, Massachusetts
Norwich University*, Northfield, Vermont
Ohio State University, Columbus, Ohio
Parsons The New School for Design, Department of Architecture, Interior Design and Lighting,  New York, New York*
Portland State University, School of Architecture,  Portland, Oregon 
Prairie View A&M University*, Prairie View, Texas
Pratt Institute*, Graduate Architecture and Urban Design (GAUD), New York, New York
Princeton University, School of Architecture,  Princeton, New Jersey
Rensselaer Polytechnic Institute*, Troy, New York
Rhode Island School of Design,  Providence, Rhode Island*
Rice University*, Houston, Texas
Rochester Institute of Technology, Rochester, New York
Roger Williams University, Bristol, Rhode Island
Savannah College of Art and Design, Savannah, Georgia
School of the Art Institute of Chicago, Chicago, Illinois
South Dakota State University, Brookings, South Dakota
Southern California Institute of Architecture ("SCI-Arc"),  Los Angeles, California*
Southern Illinois University Carbondale,  Carbondale, Illinois
University at Buffalo, The State University of New York, Buffalo, New York
Syracuse University*, Syracuse, New York
Temple University, Tyler School of Art,  Philadelphia, Pennsylvania
Texas A&M University, College Station, Texas
Texas Tech University, Lubbock, Texas
Tulane University, New Orleans, Louisiana
University of Arizona*, College of Architecture and Landscape Architecture,  Tucson, Arizona
University of California, Berkeley, College of Environmental Design,  Berkeley, California
University of California, Los Angeles, Department of Architecture and Urban Design,  Los Angeles, California
University of Cincinnati, College of Design, Architecture, Art and Planning, Cincinnati, Ohio
University of Colorado Denver, Denver, Colorado
University of Detroit Mercy, Detroit, Michigan
University of Florida, Gainesville, Florida
University of Hartford, Department of Architecture, Hartford, Connecticut
University of Houston, Gerald D. Hines College of Architecture*, Houston, Texas
University of Idaho, Moscow, Idaho
University of Illinois at Chicago*, Chicago, Illinois
University of Illinois at Urbana–Champaign
University of Kansas, School of Architecture, Design, and Planning,  Lawrence, Kansas *
University of Kentucky, College of Design,  Lexington, Kentucky *
University of Louisiana at Lafayette*, Lafayette, Louisiana
University of Maine at Augusta
University of Maryland, College Park
University of Massachusetts-Amherst, Amherst, Massachusetts
University of Memphis, Memphis, Tennessee
University of Miami*, Coral Gables, Florida
University of Michigan, Taubman College of Architecture and Urban Planning , Ann Arbor, Michigan
University of Minnesota, Twin Cities
University of Nebraska–Lincoln, Lincoln, Nebraska
University of Nevada, Las Vegas, Las Vegas, Nevada
University of New Mexico, Albuquerque, New Mexico
University of North Carolina at Charlotte*, Charlotte, North Carolina
University of Notre Dame*, Notre Dame, Indiana
University of Oklahoma*, Norman, Oklahoma
University of Oregon*, Eugene, Oregon
University of Pennsylvania, School of Design (PennDesign),  Philadelphia, Pennsylvania
Universidad de Puerto Rico
University of South Florida, Tampa, Florida
University of Southern California*, Los Angeles, California
University of Tennessee, Knoxville*, Knoxville, Tennessee
University of Texas at Arlington, Arlington, Texas
University of Texas at Austin*, School of Architecture,  Austin, Texas
University of Texas at San Antonio, College of Architecture,  San Antonio, Texas
University of Utah, Salt Lake City, Utah
University of Virginia*, Charlottesville, Virginia
University of Washington, College of Architecture and Urban Planning,  Seattle, Washington
University of Wisconsin–Milwaukee, School of Architecture and Urban Planning, Milwaukee, Wisconsin*
Virginia Polytechnic Institute and State University, College of Architecture and Urban Studies,  Blacksburg, Virginia*
Washington State University, School of Design and Construction, Pullman, Washington
Washington University in St. Louis, Sam Fox School of Design and Visual Arts, Graduate School of Architecture and Urban Design 
Wentworth Institute of Technology*, Boston, Massachusetts
Woodbury University, in Burbank, CA - Master of Architecture in Real Estate Development
Yale University, School of Architecture,  New Haven, Connecticut

Canada
Colleges and universities in Canada with accredited Master of Architecture degree programs are listed below:

University of British Columbia
University of Calgary
Carleton University
Université Laval
McGill University
University of Manitoba
Université de Montréal
University of Guelph (Only Master of Landscape Architecture)
University of Toronto
Dalhousie University
University of Waterloo, School of Architecture
Ryerson University

Australia and New Zealand
Universities in Australia and New Zealand with accredited Master of Architecture degree programs are listed below :

Curtin University
Griffith University
Deakin University
Monash University
Queensland University of Technology (QUT)
RMIT University
University of Adelaide
University of Canberra
University of Melbourne
University of Newcastle
University of New South Wales
University of Queensland
University of South Australia (UniSA)
University of Sydney
University of Tasmania
University of Technology, Sydney (UTS)
University of Western Australia
University of Auckland
Unitec New Zealand
Victoria University of Wellington

Hong Kong
The only 2 universities offering HKIA (Hong Kong Institute of Architects), CAA (Commonwealth Association of Architects) & RIBA (Royal Institute of British Architects) accredited Master of Architecture for architect professional registration.
 The Chinese University of Hong Kong, School of Architecture, Hong Kong, founded in 1992 
 The University of Hong Kong, Faculty of Architecture, Department of Architecture, Hong Kong, founded in 1950

China
Tsinghua University, Beijing
Beijing University of Civil Engineering and Architecture, Beijing
Tongji University, Shanghai
Southeast University, Nanjing
Xi'an Jiaotong-Liverpool University, starting fall 2014, language: English
Hunan University, Changsha

Singapore
National University of Singapore
Singapore University of Technology and Design

Mexico
In Mexico, an officially recognized Bachelor of Architecture is sufficient for practice.

Faculty of Architecture at the National Autonomous University of Mexico
Monterrey Institute of Technology and Higher Education
Universidad Autónoma Benito Juárez de Oaxaca
Universidad Autónoma de Guadalajara
Universidad Autónoma de Nuevo León
Universidad Autónoma de San Luis Potosí

Africa
University of Pretoria
University of Cape Town
University of the Witwatersrand
University of Johannesburg
Tshwane University of Technology
University of Nigeria, Enugu Campus
University of Carthage
Uganda Martyrs University
University of the Free State
Nelson Mandela Metropolitan University
University of Nairobi
Caleb University
Ardhi University, Tanzania
Kwame Nkrumah University of Science and Technology, Ghana
Ahmadu Bello University, Zaria
Federal University of Technology, Akure
Federal University of Technology, Minna. Nigeria.

India
Some universities in India with accredited Master of Architecture degree programs are listed below:
School of Architecture, Bharath University
Crescent School of Architecture, Chennai
School of Planning and Architecture, New Delhi
CEPT University, India
Sir J. J. College of Architecture, Mumbai
CET Trivandrum, Kerala
Jamia Millia Islamia, New Delhi
Sushant school of art and architecture, Gurgaon. Haryana 
Dr. Baliram Hiray College Of Architecture, Mumbai
I.E.S College of Architecture; Mumbai
Bhartiya Kala Prasarini Sabha'S College Of Architecture, Pune.
IIEST Shibpur
IIT Roorkee
IIT Kharagpur
IIT Mumbai
NIT Jaipur
Ramaiah Institute of Technology, Bangalore
R V College of Architecture, Bangalore
Maulana Azad National Institute of Technology, Bhopal
School of Planning and Architecture, Bhopal
School of Planning and Architecture, Vijayawada
McGAN'S Ooty School of Architecture
Faculty of Architecture & Design, Manipal Academy of Higher Education, Karnataka
Rachana Sansad's Academy of Architecture, Mumbai, India
Dr. Baliram Hiray College of Architecture, Mumbai, India
Kamla Raheja Vidyanidhi Institute for Architecture and Environmental StudiesMumbai university
Deenbandhu Chhotu Ram University of Science and Technology
Faculty of architecture and ekistics jamia millia islamia;New Delhi
L.S. Raheja School of Architecture, Mumbai
Rizvi College of Architecture, Mumbai
School of Architecture and Planning, Anna University, Chennai
Excel College of Architecture and Planning
Jadavpur University, Kolkata
D.Y.Patil school of Architecture, Pune
BGS School of Architecture and Planning, Bengaluru
Measi Academy of Architecture, Chennai
Prime college of architecture and planning, Nagapattinam

Iran
Some universities in Iran with accredited Master of Architecture degree programs are listed below:
Tehran University
Shahid Beheshti University (SBU)
Iran University of Science and Technology
Tarbiat Modares University (TMU)
Tabriz Islamic Art University
Yazd University
University of Shahrood
Islamic Azad University
Sooreh University
Shiraz University

Schools and Universities in Europe

Austria
Academy of fine Arts, Vienna Institute for Art and Architecture (B.Arch. and M.Arch. language: German and English) (Austria)

Belgium
 WENK Gent Brussels (Sint Lucas Institute of Architecture) Sint Lucas Ghent Brussels in Belgium (language: English)

Denmark
Royal Danish Academy of Fine Arts (M.A. Professional Degree, language: English)(Denmark)

Finland
University of Oulu (M.S. Professional Degree, language: English)(Finland)
University of Tampere (M.S. Professional Degree, language: English)(Finland)
Aalto University (M.S. Professional Degree, language: English)(Finland)

Germany
DIA Dessau (Dessau International Architecture) at the Hochschule Anhalt / Bauhaus Dessau in Germany (language: English)
Hochschule Wismar (language: German and English) in Wismar, Germany

Ireland
Cork Centre for Architectural Education (University College Cork/Munster Technological University)
Technological University Dublin
University College Dublin

Italy
Politecnico di Torino - I Facoltà di Architettura I  (Italy)
Politecnico di Torino - II Facoltà di Architettura  (Italy)

Liechtenstein
Hochschule Liechtenstein (candidate for accreditation, language: English)

Netherlands
TU Delft Faculty of Architecture (M.S. Professional Degree, language: English)
Academy of Architecture at the Amsterdam School of Art
Artez Academy of Architecture in Arnhem
Academie van Bouwkunst Groningen https://www.hanze.nl/nld/onderwijs/techniek/academie-van-bouwkunst
Academie van bouwkunst Maastricht
The Rotterdam Academy of Architecture and Urban Design
TU Eindhoven Faculty of Architecture, Building and Planning (M.S. Professional Degree, language: English)

Poland
Warsaw University of Technology Architecture and Urban Planning with specialisation Architecture for Society of Knowledge (M.Arch. language: English) (Poland)
Cracow University of Technology Department of Architecture with specialisation Architecture and Urban Planning (M.Arch. RIBA accredited) (Poland)
Wroclaw University of Science and Technology 
(M.Arch. language: English) (Poland)

Serbia
University of Belgrade Architecture and Urban Planning (M.Arch. RIBA accredited)(M.Arch. language: Serbian, English)
University of Novi Sad Architecture  (M.Arch. language: Serbian, English)

Slovenia
University of Ljubljana [http://www.fa.uni-lj.si/ Architecture and Urban Planning (M.Arch. language: English) (M.I.A. Language: Slovenian)

Spain
Universidad de Navarra Department of Architecture (M.D.A. language: Spanish and English) (Spain)
The University of the Basque Country The University of the Basque Country (M.D.A. Language: Basque or Spanish) (Basque Country, Spain)

Switzerland
 Jointmaster of Architecture in Berne, Fribourg and Geneva, (languages: English and French)  (Switzerland)
Accademia di Architettura di Mendrisio (Switzerland)
Academie van Bouwkunst Tilburg (the Netherlands)

United Kingdom
All M.Arch courses listed below comply with RIBA and ARB accreditation, complying to RIBA's Part 2 stage before Part 3 and Architect registry.

England
University of Bath, Department of Architecture and Civil Engineering, Bath, as MArch
Birmingham City University, Birmingham School of Architecture, Birmingham, as MArch
Arts University Bournemouth, Bournemouth, as MArch
University of Brighton, Brighton, as MArch
University of the West of England (UWE Bristol), Bristol, as MArch
University of Cambridge, Department of Architecture, Cambridge as MPhil
The University of Creative Arts, Canterbury School of Architecture, as MArch
The University of Kent (Canterbury), Kent School of Architecture, as MArch
The University of Huddersfield, School of Art, Design and Architecture. as M.Arch or M.Arch (International)
Leeds Beckett University, School of Arts, as MArch or Level 7 Architecture Apprenticeship.
De Montfort University, The Leicester School of Architecture, Leicester, as March or Level 7 Architecture Apprenticeship.
University of Lincoln, The Lincoln School of Architecture, Lincoln, as MArch
University of Liverpool, Liverpool School of Architecture, Liverpool, as MArch
Liverpool John Moores University, Liverpool, as MArch
Architectural Association School of Architecture, London, as Final Examination
The London School of Architecture as MArch
The University College of London, The Bartlett School of Architecture, as MArch
The University of Arts, London, Central Saint Martins College of Art and Design, London, as MArch
The University of East London, School of Architecture, Computing and Engineering, as March
The University of Greenwich London, School of Architecture, Design and Construction, London, as MArch
Kingston University London, Kingston School of Art, London, as MArch
London Metropolitan University, Sir John Cass Faculty of Art, Architecture and Design, as MArch or Level 7 Architect Apprenticeship
Royal College of Art, School of Architecture, as MA
London South Bank University, Engineering, Science and the Built Environment, as MArch or Level 7 Architect Apprenticeship
The University of Westminster, Department of Architecture, as M.Arch
University of Manchester and Manchester Metropolitan University, The Manchester School of Architecture, as MArch or Level 7 Architect Apprenticeship
The University of Newcastle upon Tyne, School of Architecture, Planning and Landscape, Newcastle, as M.Arch
Northumbria University, Architecture Department, School of the Built Environment, Newcastle upon Tyne, as MArch orLevel 7 Architect Apprenticeship
The University of Nottingham, Architecture and Built Environment, Nottingham, as MArch
Nottingham Trent University, School of Architecture, Design and the Built Environment. as M.Arch
Oxford Brookes University, School of Architecture, Oxford, as M.ARchD
University of Central Lancashire (UCLAN), (Preston) The Grenfell-Baines School of Architecture, Construction and Environment, as MArch
RIBA Studio, as Diploma
The University of Plymouth, Plymouth School of Architecture, Design and Environment, Plymouth, as M.Arch
The University of Portsmouth, Portsmouth School of Architecture, Portsmouth, as MArch
The University of Sheffield, Sheffield School of Architecture, Sheffield, as MArch
Sheffield Hallam University, Department of Architecture and Planning, Sheffield, as M.Arch

Northern Ireland
The Queen's University Belfast as MArch
The University of Ulster as MArch

Scotland
University of Dundee as MArch (with Honours)
University of Edinburgh, The Edinburgh College of Art, MArch
University of Strathclyde (Glasgow) as PgDip or MArch 
Glasgow School of Art, Mackintosh School of Architecture, as MArch
Robert Gordon University, The Scott Sutherland School of Architecture & Built Environment, via BSc/MArch (Integrated Degree) or MArch
Duncan of Jordanstone College of Art and Design as MArch

Wales
Cardiff University, Welsh School of Architecture, via BSc/MArch (Integrated Degree) or MArch

Schools and Universities in the Middle East 

Technion Department of Architecture (M.Arch. language: English) (Israel)
Middle East Technical University Department of Architecture (M.Arch. language: English) (Turkey)
Mimar Sinan Fine Arts University  (B.Arch. and M.Arch. language: Turkish) (Turkey)

King Saud University, college of architecture and planning ( Riyadh, Saudi Arabia)
B.Arch main major: 
 1- Science of building 
 2- Urban design 
And there's master's degree and PHD

Language: English, Arabic

Rank (according to NAAB 2012) #1 architecture school in middle east

See also
Bachelor of Architecture
Doctor of Architecture
National Council of Architectural Registration Boards

References

Architecture schools
Master's degrees
Architectural education